The1981 Italy rugby union tour of Australia was a series of matches played between June and August 1981 in Australia by in Australia by Italy national rugby union team.  No test matches was played.  It was the first visit to Australia by an Italian rugby team, and follow after one year the tour of New Zealand and Pacific.

Results 

Scores and results list Italys' points tally first.

Bibliography 
  Valerio Vecchiarelli, Francesco Volpe, 2000, Italia in meta, GS editore, 2000.

References 

Italy
tour
tour
Italy national rugby union team tours
Rugby union tours of Australia